Kampanerang Kuba (International title: Enchanting Fatima / Transl. Hunchbacked Lady Bell-ringer) is a 2005 Philippine fantasy soap opera television series broadcast by ABS-CBN. It aired from June 6 to December 16, 2005. It was inspired by the 1973 film of the same name, which starred Vilma Santos and Edgar Mortiz. It was tagged as Pinoy Disney. It was originally based from a comic book series written by Pablo S. Gomez.

Directed by Wenn V. Deramas and Andoy Ranay, it stars Anne Curtis, Christian Bautista, Jean Garcia, Eula Valdez, Luis Manzano, Patrick Garcia, Jodi Sta. Maria, Desiree del Valle, and Jomari Yllana.

It was re-aired on Jeepney TV from 2013 to 2014 and 2017.

Story

Background
Lucia and Lourdes Saavedra are half-sisters. Lucia has fallen in love with Antonio (a poor man of whom her father disapproves), while Lourdes falls in love with Martin. She is unaware that he is Prinsipe Abuk, who has betrayed his people to be human instead of a kuba and who has fallen for Lucia. Lucia marries Antonio; she later believes he was killed from a beating her father engineered. Her maid (and friend) Jacinta told her he was dead to one day win his love. Lucia was also told that her baby daughter was stillborn (although she is sure she heard her cry before she lost consciousness). Lourdes gives birth the same night, delivering a baby girl whom she saw was a kuba before she passed out. Martin switches his baby with Lucia's, leaving his own baby at a church.

The kampanera
The young kuba is named Imang, and grows up to be the kampanera (the person who rings the church bell). She later becomes the nursemaid of Lourdes, and bonds with her immediately. Lourdes' "daughter" Veronica is jealous and finds comfort with her Aunt Lucia, who has returned home after beginning a new life with her American husband and stepson Luke. Lucia doubts Veronica is her daughter since she has never felt a motherly bond with her. Lourdes is jealous of Lucia's closeness to Martin.

The nuns try to help Imang, and bring her back to life after Martin wrongly convinced people she was evil and deserved to be stoned for stealing a sacred crown from the church, with the help of Veronica (who wanted to be with Luke due to her jealously of Imang with him). They later found a candle that, when lit, would make her human. She used this to pretend to be Lucia's long-lost daughter Bernadette to remain close to her mother Lourdes (who, after Imang's "death", was finally told by the nuns that Imang was really her daughter).

Meanwhile, Veronica is angry that Luke has not returned her love and loves Bernadette instead. She uses magic to change her appearance, and adopts the name Agatha to gain her family's trust and avenge Bernadette. Pablo has fallen for Bernadette (although he would always make fun of her as Imang), and the truth about his parentage is raised. Lorenzo loved Imang when she was a kuba. After Lucia's husband Clark dies, she discovers that Antonio did not die; he has lost the use of his legs and believes she betrayed him (when, instead, her father was to blame). She and Antonio discover that Veronica is actually their daughter.

Conclusion
In the end, everybody finds out whose daughter belongs to whom. Bernadette/Imang does not need the candle to remain human. Veronica is turned into a tree for her many misdeeds, and her parents rekindle their marriage while they care for her. Martin is a kuba, and Lourdes still loves him now that he is good. Luke sacrificed his life for Imang/Bernadette; Bernadette chooses to be with Pablo, while Lorenzo finds another who looks like her.

Pre-production
It was first rumored that Claudine Barretto then Jodi Sta. Maria will get the title role for "Fatima", often referred to as "Imang", but ABS-CBN picked Anne Curtis instead, shortly after she transferred from GMA Network. On the other hand, Jodi got the role of Veronica. This was a reunion between Eula Valdez and Jean Garcia after their successful show Pangako Sa 'Yo, which ran from 2000 up to 2002, when they played rivals Amor and Claudia. In Kuba they played as sisters. Ten years later, Eula Valdez, Jean Garcia and Jomari Yllana reunited together in The Half Sisters aired on GMA Network. Jodi left the role, due to pregnancy and was replaced by Desiree Del Valle. This is Patrick Garcia's last show, before moving to GMA Network. Like Eula and Jean, this was also the reunion of Jodi and Patrick after the successful of Pangako Sa 'Yo, Tabing Ilog and Darating ang Umaga.

The series also marked the acting debuts of Luis Manzano and Christian Bautista.

Pablo S. Gomez wrote the script for the series, who also works in another soap opera - Mga Anghel Na Walang Langit.

Cast and characters

Main cast 
Anne Curtis — Fatima "Imang" de Vera-Bartolome/ Bernadette Sembrano, derived from Our Lady of Fatima and St. Bernadette.
Patrick Garcia — Luke Tennyson, derived from St. Luke.
Luis Manzano — Pablo Bartolome, derived from St. Paul.
Christian Bautista — Lorenzo, derived from St. Lorenzo Ruiz.

Supporting cast 
Eula Valdez — Lourdes Saavedra-de Vera, derived from Our Lady of Lourdes.
Jean Garcia — Lucia Saavedra-Tennyson, derived from Lucia dos Santos, who experienced an apparition of the Virgin Mary.
Jomari Yllana — Martin de Vera/Prinsepe Abuk, derived from Saint Martin of Tours.
Jodi Sta. Maria / Desiree del Valle — Veronica Saavedra-Bartolome/Agatha, derived from Saint Veronica and Saint Agatha of Sicily.
Mark Bautista — Rebusakash
Eugene Domingo — Sister Clara, derived from St. Clare of Assisi.
Meryll Soriano — Sister Cecilia, derived from St. Cecilia
Yul Servo — Antonio Bartolome, derived from St. Anthony the Great.
Marco Alcaraz — Gabriel, derived from Archangel Gabriel.
Frances Makil-Ignacio — Sarah Durano
Allan Paule — Solomon Durano
Cacai Bautista — Matilda Durano
Cheena Crab — Magdalena Durano

Guest cast 
Issa Pressman — the young Imang de Vera
Joshua Cadelina — the young Lorenzo
Frederick Schnell — the young Luke

Production and crew
Directed by: Wenn V. Deramas, Andoy L. Ranay
Assistant Director: Raymond Ocampo, Roderick Lindayag

See also
Fantaserye
List of ABS-CBN drama series
List of programs aired by ABS-CBN

References

External links 
 

2005 Philippine television series debuts
2005 Philippine television series endings
ABS-CBN drama series
Fantaserye and telefantasya
Philippine musical television series
Television shows based on comics
Television series by Star Creatives
Filipino-language television shows
Television shows set in the Philippines